Beaver Island is an island community of the Halifax Regional Municipality in the Canadian province of Nova Scotia. The weather station code is CWBV; due to its exposed location, Beaver Island can receive very powerful winds, especially from offshore. Since 1846 there has been a lighthouse on the island.

Climate

References
Explore HRM
Beaver Island Lighthouse
NSLPS

Communities in Halifax, Nova Scotia
Meteorological stations
General Service Areas in Nova Scotia